Bisco or BISCO may refer to:

People
 Joy Bisco (b. 1975), American actress
 Christie Bisco, the maiden name of Christie Colin (b. 1982), American archer
 Bisco Hatori (b. 1975), Japanese manga artist

Other
 BISCO, the abbreviation for British Iron & Steel Corporation
 BSSCO, pronounced "bisko," the abbreviation for bismuth strontium calcium copper oxide, a family of high-temperature superconductors
Disco Biscuits, a Philadelphia-based Livetronica band

See also
 Biscoe (disambiguation)
 Bisko